Bystrá is a village and municipality in Stropkov District in the Prešov Region of north-eastern Slovakia.

History
In historical records the village was first mentioned in 1405.

Geography
The municipality lies at an altitude of 400 metres and covers an area of 3.012 km². It has a population of about 33 people.

Ethnicity
According to the 2001 Census, 52.6% were Slovak and 47.4% Rusyn.

Religion
According to the 2001 Census, 92.1% were Greek Catholic, 5.3% Orthodox and 2.6% Roman Catholic.

Genealogical resources

The records for genealogical research are available at the state archive "Statny Archiv in Presov, Slovakia"

 Greek Catholic church records (births/marriages/deaths): 1885-1952 (parish B)

See also
 List of municipalities and towns in Slovakia

References

External links
 
 https://web.archive.org/web/20071217080336/http://www.statistics.sk/mosmis/eng/run.html
 Surnames of living people in Bystra

Villages and municipalities in Stropkov District
Zemplín (region)